Dimitrios Theodoropoulos (born 16 December 1954) is a Greek former swimmer. He competed in two events at the 1972 Summer Olympics.

References

1954 births
Living people
Greek male swimmers
Olympic swimmers of Greece
Swimmers at the 1972 Summer Olympics
Place of birth missing (living people)